Gorenja Vas is a small village in the Municipality of Ivančna Gorica in central Slovenia. It lies just off the regional road leading south out of Ivančna Gorica towards Muljava. The area is part of the historical region of Lower Carniola. The municipality is now included in the Central Slovenia Statistical Region.

References

External links

Gorenja Vas on Geopedia

Populated places in the Municipality of Ivančna Gorica